Wings Airways was a commuter airline based out of Wings Field in Blue Bell, Pennsylvania.

The airline focused primarily on shuttling passengers to nearby airports throughout the region. Wings Airways promised faster commute times to and from major airports for those living in neighboring suburban areas of Philadelphia. The primary route served by the air carrier was the short hop between Wings Field (KLOM) (BBX) in Blue Bell and the Philadelphia International Airport (KPHL)(PHL) which was a flight of less than 15 minutes.  From the late 1970s to the late 1980s, Wings operated a high frequency shuttle service between LOM and PHL with up to 22 round trip flights on weekdays.

However, the airline then shutdown during the early 1990s due to the construction of Interstate 476 and other highways and freeways in the greater Philadelphia area, which made it easier for those living in the suburbs to access Philadelphia International Airport. According to a publication by 2004 newsletter from Wings Field, there were 152 operations a day at Wings Field (55,540 for the year) during the airline's peak in 1990.

Fleet

All three of the above aircraft types featured short takeoff and landing (STOL) performance.  Wings Airways was one of the few commuter airlines in the U.S. to operate the Trislander in scheduled passenger service.

Destinations
United States:
Delaware
Dover
New Jersey
Cape May Airport - WWD
Millville, New Jersey (Millville Municipal Airport)
New York
New York (John F. Kennedy International Airport)
Pennsylvania
Allentown (Lehigh Valley International Airport)
Blue Bell (Wings Field) Base
Northeast Philadelphia (Northeast Philadelphia Airport)
Philadelphia (Philadelphia International Airport)
Virginia
Dulles (Washington Dulles International Airport)
District of Columbia
Washington D.C. (Washington National Airport)

See timetables at http://www.airtimes.com/cgat/usc/wings.htm

See also
 List of defunct airlines of the United States
 Wings Field

References

Defunct airlines of the United States
Airlines established in 1976
Airlines disestablished in 1991
1976 establishments in Pennsylvania